Birmingham Motors was a United States based automobile company. Organized in 1920, it was tentatively in business only from 1921 through 1923.

The Birmingham offered a number of unusual features, including a type of swing axle suspension and exterior finishes of DuPont Fabrikoid instead of paint.

Failure to generate capital for factory investment hobbled Birmingham. A political scandal involving the mayor of Jamestown, New York who was the company's titular President resulted in Birmingham Motors going out of business.  Only about 50 Birmingham autos were built; none of which are known to have survived to the 21st century.

References
 Birmingham Motors on Scripophily.net
 Washington Post, Sep 25, 1921

Defunct motor vehicle manufacturers of the United States
Motor vehicle manufacturers based in New York (state)
1920s cars
Vehicle manufacturing companies established in 1920
Vehicle manufacturing companies disestablished in 1923
1920 establishments in New York (state)
1923 disestablishments in New York (state)
Defunct manufacturing companies based in New York (state)